Valorie D. Thomas is an American Africana studies scholar, consultant, and screenwriter. She is the Phebe Estelle Spalding Professor of English and Africana Studies at Pomona College in Claremont, California.

Early life 
Thomas studied at the University of California, Berkeley, where she received her bachelor's, master's, and doctoral degrees. She also holds a master's degree in screenwriting from the University of California, Los Angeles.

Career 
Thomas began teaching at Pomona College in 1998. She is the Phebe Estelle Spalding Professor of English and Africana Studies, an endowed chair.

Recognition 
In 2013, Thomas won Pomona's Wig Distinguished Professor Award, the college's highest faculty honor, in recognition of her teaching.

Personal life 
Thomas is an equestrian and practices yoga.

References

External links
Personal website
Faculty page at Pomona College

Year of birth missing (living people)
Living people
Pomona College faculty
American Africanists
Black studies scholars
21st-century American women
American consultants
Screenwriters from California
American women screenwriters
African-American screenwriters
21st-century African-American women
21st-century African-American people
African-American women writers